Chiltern railway station is located on the North East line in Victoria, Australia. It serves the town of Chiltern, and it opened on 21 November 1873.

In 1978, No. 4 road and the goods platform was abolished.

It was closed as a staff station on 19 June 1987. Former No.2 and No.3 roads were removed by 10 July of the same year.

In 2000, the former crossing loop on the standard gauge line was extended by 670 metres at the Down end.

The original platform was located on the broad gauge line. Between 2008-2011, this line was converted to standard gauge, and another platform was built on the existing 1962 built standard gauge line.

A disused goods shed is located at the station. The goods shed was converted into a community centre in 2011, and on 4 March 2021, ownership was transferred to the Chiltern Model Club.

Disused station Barnawartha is located between Chiltern and Wodonga stations.

Platforms and services

Chiltern has two side platforms. It is serviced by V/Line Albury line services.

Platform 1:
 services to Southern Cross

Platform 2:
 services to Albury

References

External links
Victorian Railway Stations gallery

Railway stations in Australia opened in 1873
Regional railway stations in Victoria (Australia)